Andrei Ivanovich Bogdanov (1692 – September 11, 1766) was one of the first  Russian bibliographers and ethnographers.

Andrei Bogdanov was born in Siberia; his father was a gunpowder-maker and Andrei had assisted him in his work. Once his family moved to newly founded Saint Petersburg, young Andrei Bogdanov went to the Academy gymnasium (a secondary school run by the Russian Academy of Sciences). In 1719 according to Peter the Great's edict Bogdanov began work in the field of typographical art. In 1730 he was assigned to the library of the Academy of Sciences.

His major literary and historic work was Description of Saint-Petersburg from the beginning in the year 1703 up to the year 1751, a first encyclopaedic description of the newly built Russian capital based on available archival materials and recollections of the eyewitnesses. The work was accomplished by 1751 and Bogdanov as its author was awarded 50 roubles for it, but it was first published only in 1779, after his death.

References

External links
  Moiseeva G.N. Bogdanov Andrei Ivanovich 

1692 births
1766 deaths
Russian bibliographers
Ethnographers
Textual scholarship